Compton Verney Art Gallery is an art gallery at Compton Verney, England.

Overview
The Art Gallery is home to six permanent collections including Neapolitan art from 1600 to 1800; Northern European medieval art from 1450 to 1650; British portraits including paintings of Henry VIII, Elizabeth I and Edward VI and works by Joshua Reynolds; Chinese bronzes including objects from the Neolithic and Shang periods; British folk art; and the Enid Marx/Margaret Lambert Collection of folk art from around the world which inspired the textile designs of 20th century artist Enid Marx.

History
In 1993, the Peter Moores Foundation (PMF) bought the site, including the near-derelict mansion, and gifted it to the specially-created charitable trust Compton Verney House Trust (CVHT).

Following a £45 million building project to restore the Grade-I listed Georgian mansion and add a Stanton Williams designed modern wing to house exhibition spaces and visitor facilities, Compton Verney staged a preview season in 1998 on the newly restored ground floor rooms, showcasing the important British Folk Art Collection, which the PMF had already bought from collector Andras Kalman.

Following this Compton Verney continued to engage with people in the local area via a series of outreach projects and art installations within the grounds.
Compton Verney fully opened to the public as a major, nationally accredited art gallery in March 2004.
The special exhibitions programme offers both historic and contemporary shows and is designed to appeal to a wide audience.

Art exhibitions
The following art exhibitions have been held:

2000
Anya Gallaccio and Simon Patterson were commissioned to make new work for the Compton Verney grounds.

2001
Folk Art in Village Halls - Compton Verney took the British Folk Art Collection on a tour around South Warwickshire as part of Museums and Galleries Month 
John Frankland: Untitled Boulder – a vast climbing boulder within the 18th-century 'Capability' Brown landscape.
Tim Brennan: Three Manoeuvres - Brennan's 'manoeuvres' take the form of journeys and walks. Using the model of the historical guided tour, Brennan devised a series of walks in response to the transient state of Compton Verney
Marcus Coates: CB3CV ChiffChaff - Coates is particularly interested in the relationship between animals and humans. GB3CV ChiffChaff was an attempt to search for parallels between the communication systems of wild birds and amateur radio enthusiasts

2002
John Kippin: Beauty Harmony Truth: Navigating the English Country House

2003
Jacqueline Donachie, Ben Sadler, Graham Parker, Matthew Thompson: 'Walkabout' – a series of artists' walks inspired by the local area
Aleksandra Mir: Plane Landing - Working in partnership with Cameron Balloons in Bristol, Mir created a giant inflatable plane (20 m by 15 m) that hovered above the grounds of Compton Verney as if about to land.
Keith Wilson: Cattle Market – a series of temporary sculptures created for the grounds of Compton Verney.
Bob and Roberta Smith: Mobile Reality Creator

2004
Peter Greenaway: Luper – re-visited the setting of Greenaway's 1982 film The Draughtsman's Contract, a baroque thriller played out against the backdrop of a country house.

2005
Only Make Believe: Ways of Playing – the work of Francis Alÿs, Ida Applebroog, Clive Barker, Hans Bellmer, Christian Boltanski, Mat Collishaw, Dorothy Cross, Adam Dant, Henry Darger, Erno Goldfinger, Roger Hilton, Joan Jonas, Glenn Kaino, Wassily Kandinsky, Zbigniew Libera, Melissa McGill, Wendy McMurdo, Annette Messager, Piet Mondrian, The Brothers Quay, Paula Rego, Gerrit Rietveld, Laurie Simmons, Kiki Smith, Monika Sosnowska, Jo Stockham, Richard Wentworth, Sarah Woodfine and Kumi Yamashita
Salvator Rosa: Wild Landscapes
The American West – works by: Charles M. Russell, Arthur Tait, Charles Schreyvogel and Alfred Jacob Miller; nineteenth-century Plains Indian Ledger drawings; work by Indian prisoners, and Native North American artists including Minerva Cuevas, Kent Monkman, Edward Poitras, James Luna and Cisco Jimenez. Interpretations on the theme by Ed Ruscha, Elaine Reichek, Luigi Ontani and Ed Kienholz were also included
Luc Tymans: The Go Between
Susan Hiller: The J Street Project

2006
Francis Bacon and Franz Xaver Messerschmidt
Van Gogh and Britain: Pioneer Collectors
The Starry Messenger: Visions of the Universe
Richard Billingham: Zoo
Vive La Parisienne: Women through the eyes of the Impressionists
Liz Rideal: Fall, River, Snow

2007
Opulance and Anxiety: Landscape Paintings from the Royal Academy of Arts
Kate Whiteford: Airfield
The Shadow. Included artists: Doug Aitken, Laurie Anderson, Christian Boltanski, Ceal Floyer, Mona Hatoum, Gary Hill, Tracey Moffatt, Anri Sala, Fiona Tan, Andy Warhol, William Wegman and Francesca Woodman
Georges de La Tour: Master of Candelight
The Naked Portrait 1900–2007

2008
James Coleman
Alberto Giacometti
The Fabric of Myth. Including artists: Delaine le Bas, Joseph Beuys, Louise Bourgeois, William Holman Hunt, Alice Kettle, Henry Moore, Elaine Reichek, Bispo do Rosário, Tilleke Schwarz and Michelle Walker
Special Display – Portraits from Chequers: Kings, Queens and Revolutionaries
Jack B. Yeats – Masquerade and Spectacle: The Circus and Traveling Fair

2009
Fatal Attraction: Diana and Actaeon – The Forbidden Gaze
Georgian Portraits: Seeing is Believing
Constable Portraits: The Painter and His Circle
The Artists Studio – works by: J. M. W. Turner, Eric Ravilious, Gwen John, Paula Rego, Lisa Milroy and Jeremy Deller.

2010
Francis Bacon: In Camera
Volcano: Turner to Warhol – works by: Joseph Wright, J. M. W. Turner and Andy Warhol
Kurt Tong: In Case it Rains in Heaven
Artists Christmas Cards: Vintage designs from the 1930s to the 1950s

2011
Alfred Wallis and Ben Nicholson
Wool Work: A Sailors Art
What the Folk say: Contemporary Artist interventions
Stanley Spencer and the English Garden
'Capability' Brown and the landscapes of Middle England
Quentin Blake: As Large as Life
Remember, remember: A history of fireworks in Britain

2012
Into the light: French and British painting from Impressionism to the early 1920s – works by: Vanessa Bell, Eugène Boudin, Paul Cézanne, Claude Monet, Camille Pissarro, Pierre-Auguste Renoir, Walter Sickert, Alfred Sisley, Alexander Stanhope Forbes and Philip Wilson Steer.
Gainsborough's Landscapes: Themes and Variations
Flight and the Artistic Imagination – works by: Leonardo da Vinci, Henri Matisse, Paul Nash, Peter Lanyon and Hiraki Sawa.
Tapestry: Weaving the century at Dovecot Studios 1912-2012

2013
Bellini, Botticelli, Titan...500 years of Italian Art – works by: Giovanni Bellini, Sandro Botticelli, Titian, Salvator Rosa and Francesco Guardi.
Outside In: Central – part of a national project based at Pallant House Gallery, which supports artists who find it difficult to access the art world.
Empty Nest by Hillary Jack
Turner and Constable: Sketching from Nature – works from the Tate collection.
Re-Viewing the landscape: A contemporary response. Including works by: Sarah Woodfine, George Shaw and Paul Ryan.
A Fantastical Animal Alphabet: Marco's Animal Alphabet
Curious Beasts: Animal prints from the British Museum

2014
Moore Rodin – organised in collaboration with the Henry Moore Foundation and Musée Rodin, Paris
Art from Ammunition: Trench art from the First World War
British Folk Art Exhibition – organised with Tate Britain

2015 
The Nonconformists: photographs by Martin Parr - organised in collaboration with La Fabrica, Madrid.
Canaletto - Celebrating Britain
The National Gallery's Masterpiece Display - The National Gallery’s Masterpiece Tour for 2015
The Hart Silversmiths: A Living Tradition - organised in collaboration with The University of Warwick and The Hart Silversmiths Trust
The Arts & Crafts House: Then and Now
Periodic Tales

Location
Compton Verney Art Gallery is situated on the B4086 between the villages of Kineton and Wellesbourne.

See also
 Compton Verney House

References

External links

2004 establishments in England
Art museums established in 2004
Art museums and galleries in Warwickshire
Folk art museums and galleries
Art Gallery